Little Satilla River may refer to:

The Little Satilla River (Satilla River), a tributary of the Satilla River in Georgia in the United States
The Little Satilla River (Atlantic Ocean) in Georgia in the United States, not a tributary of the Satilla River

See also 
 Satilla River
 Little Satilla Creek